Eigenmannia bumba is a species of glass knifefish from the rio Mearim basin in the northeast of Brazil.

Etymology
The species name of “bumba” is in reference to “bumba meu boi” or “boi-bumbá”, a folklore character in Northern Brazil.

References

Sternopygidae
Fish of Brazil
Taxa named by Guilherme Moreira Dutra
Taxa named by Telton Pedro Anselmo Ramos  
Taxa named by Naércio Aquino de Menezes
Fish described in 2022